Go Ahead is a 2020 Chinese television drama series, which revolves around three non blood-related kids who became each other's family. It premiered on Hunan TV on August 10, 2020. The series was a hit, and was well received by audiences for its warm familial theme. It aired on iQIYI globally with multi-language subtitles on October 8, 2020. In Vietnam, it aired on FPT Play on August 12, 2020 and on YouTube by Huace TV Vietnam on November 11, 2020. Netflix also gained the rights to air the show.

Synopsis 
Li Jianjian (Tan Songyun), Ling Xiao (Song Weilong), and He Ziqiu (Zhang Xincheng) are three individuals unrelated by blood but become each other's family. They bond over their shared family troubles and support each other through the ups and downs of life. The story follows them through childhood, high school, college, and eventually adulthood. As they grow up, re-kindle relationships with their biological family, and experience hardships in life, the bond between the three becomes strained. But somehow, they always find their way back to each other.

Cast
Tan Songyun as Li Jianjian
Song Weilong as Ling Xiao
Zhang Xincheng as He Ziqiu
Tu Songyan as Li Haichao
Zhang Xilin as Ling Heping
He Ruixian as Tang Can
Sun Yi as Qi Mingyue

Production 
Filming began on September 16, 2019 and concluded on December 29, 2019 in Xiamen.

Reception 
The drama received mixed to positive reviews. In China, ratings started out very strong but dropped significantly as the series went on. Many viewers did not enjoy the storyline of two so-called adoptive brothers suddenly falling in love with their biologically unrelated sister who they grew up with referring to it as a dog-blood (cheesy) drama with too many stereotypical tropes and were disappointed by the slow plot in the latter half of the series. It ended with a rating of 6.9 on Douban. Among international viewers particularly in Asia, the drama was a big hit and received generally positive reviews.

Original Soundtrack

References

External links 
 Go Ahead - official Weibo page
 Go Ahead on Douban
 

2020 Chinese television series debuts
Hunan Television dramas
Chinese romance television series
Singapore in fiction
Television series about families